Joseph Glenn Herbert Sr. (born June 2, 1971), known professionally as Jo Koy, is an American stand-up comedian and actor. He was a frequent panelist on E!'s late night show Chelsea Lately. He has since had a number of Comedy Central and Netflix specials.

Early life
Jo Koy was born to a white American father who was in the United States Air Force stationed in the Philippines when he married Koy's Filipina mother. His family moved from Spanaway, Washington, to Tacoma, Washington, and then to Las Vegas soon after he finished high school in Tacoma. He originally attended Spanaway Lake High School and then moved to Foss High School in Tacoma. They moved to Las Vegas to be near his ailing grandmother. Jo Koy enrolled in the University of Nevada, Las Vegas but dropped out to pursue stand-up comedy.

Jo Koy's stage name comes from a nickname his family gave him growing up. It was revealed during his stand-up routine in Phoenix, Arizona, on September 22, 2019, that back in 1989, he was talking to his cousin about making a stage name when his aunt called him to come to dinner, shouting "Jo Ko, eat!" (Ko means "my" in Tagalog, so Jo Ko means "my Jo").  He misheard it and thought she said "Koy," decided it was a good name, and has used it ever since.

Career 
Jo Koy credits his mother for his comedic and acting talents. He frequently tells stories about her in his comedy shows. She encouraged him to participate in school talent shows and to hold impromptu performances for his family and friends. This led to performances at a Las Vegas coffee house and inspired a move to Los Angeles.

The young comic began his stand-up career in 1994 at a comedy club in Las Vegas. Soon he moved from open mic night to a regular spot on the show Catch a Rising Star at the MGM Grand Hotel and Casino. After performing at the MGM Grand Las Vegas, he rented the Huntridge Theater and went door to door to sell tickets to his comedy shows.

A talent coordinator from Los Angeles spotted Koy and landed him his first television appearance on BET's ComicView. He has appeared in two seasons of Comic View.

The comedian has gone on to star in other TV stand-up specials like Jamie Foxx Presents: Laffapalooza!. Jo Koy has won the Showtime at the Apollo, performed in front of troops in the USO Tour, can be seen on various VH1 I Love the 70’s, 80’s, 90’s, Tru TV's World's Dumbest and New Millennium episodes, Amp'd Mobile phone commercials and received a second invite to the Montreal comedy festival Just For Laughs, the series for which he was awarded Canada’s prestigious Gemini Award. Jo Koy was also a regular guest at Chelsea Handler’s roundtable discussion on E!'s Chelsea Lately. Jo Koy has also appeared on Carlos Mencia’s Punisher Tour performing stand-up comedy in front of fans filling 10,000-seat arenas across the country.

In 2005, Jo Koy performed on The Tonight Show with Jay Leno.  He became one of a select few comics to receive a standing ovation on the show.

He started a podcast together with comedian and TV host Michael Yo on July 23, 2012, called The Michael Yo and Jo Koy Show.

Koy has also appeared on over 100 episodes of Chelsea Lately as a season regular roundtable guest. Other appearances include: The Tonight Show Starring Jimmy Fallon, @Midnight with Chris Hardwick, VH1, World's Funniest Fails, The Joy Behar Show, Jimmy Kimmel Live!, Last Call with Carson Daly and Jamie Foxx: Laffapalooza.

Today, the comedian tours across the US and can be heard as a weekly guest on the podcast, The Adam Carolla Show. He joined the PodcastOne family and hosts the weekly podcast, The Koy Pond. Koy has done two highly-rated and successful comedy specials on Comedy Central: Don’t Make Him Angry and Lights Out. His third comedy special, Jo Koy: Live from Seattle is a Netflix Original was released on March 28, 2017 worldwide. Koy released another Netflix special titled Jo Koy: Comin' In Hot on June 12, 2019. On February 23, 2019, Koy performed two shows on stage at the Wheeler Opera House, Aspen, CO for the closing night of Aspen Laugh Festival.

On June 12, 2020, Netflix released Jo Koy: In His Elements, a comedy special featuring Filipino American comedians, DJs, and B-boys.

On July 28, 2022, Koy, alongside film producer Dan Lin appeared in the Rise for Comedy festival, where they raised a $75,000 donation to the nonprofit Search to Involve Pilipino Americans (SIPA).

Influences
Koy has named Eddie Murphy, Robin Williams, Billy Crystal, Whoopi Goldberg, Chris Rock, and Steve Martin as his comedy influences. In 2022, Blogtalk with MJ Racadio named him one of the "75 Most Influential Filipino-Americans".

Personal life
Koy has one son, Joseph Herbert Jr., born April 21, 2003, from a previous relationship with Angie King. Koy and his son reside in the San Fernando Valley area of Los Angeles, California.

On September 27, 2021, Koy and Chelsea Handler posted an official Instagram post of their relationship.  In July 2022, they announced their breakup on Handler's Instagram, which occurred in June.

Koy is a practitioner of Brazilian jiu-jitsu.

Charity work
On August 4, 2009, The Jo Koy Foundation hosted its first philanthropic event in "Hilarity for Charity" a stand-up comedy show featuring Koy, along with special surprise comedic guests. The show took place at The Jon Lovitz Comedy Club, located in the heart of Citywalk, Universal City, California. Proceeds from the ticket sales were donated to The Children’s Hospital of Orange County.

Filmography

Film

Stand-up Special

Television

References

External links 

 
 
 Comedy Central profile 
 Celebrity News : Who Is Jo Koy?

Joseph Herbert Jr. Biography 2022 - Jo Koy's Son

1971 births
Living people
20th-century American comedians
21st-century American comedians
American comedians of Asian descent
American people of Filipino descent
American stand-up comedians
Comedians from California
People from Los Angeles
People from Spanaway, Washington
People from Tacoma, Washington
University of Nevada, Las Vegas alumni